Rural (also Nepewan, Nepowan) is an unincorporated community in the Town of Dayton, Waupaca County, Wisconsin, United States.

Notable people
Rural was the home town of author and poet Margaret Ashmun (1885-1940) who was born in Rural. The Ashmun family home still stands in Rural. Wisconsin State Senator and lawyer George Hudnall (1864-1936) was also born in Rural. Rural was also the home town of Wisconsin state legislator Andrew R. Potts (1853-1932) who was born in Rural.

Images

Notes

Unincorporated communities in Wisconsin
Unincorporated communities in Waupaca County, Wisconsin